Jamides philatus , the Burmese caerulean, is a butterfly in the family Lycaenidae. It was described by Pieter Cornelius Tobias Snellen in 1877. It is found in the Indomalayan realm.

Subspecies
J. p. philatus Sulawesi, Banggai, Sula
J. p. callinicus  (Röber, 1886) . Ceram
J. p. subditus  (Moore, 1886)  Burma - Peninsular Malaya
J. p. osias  Röber, 1886) Philippines
J. p. amphyssina  (Staudinger, 1889)  Palawan
J. p. telanjang  (Doherty, 1891)  Enggano
J. p. emetallicus  (Druce, 1895)  Bachan
J. p. stresemanni  (Rothschild, 1915) Serang
J. p. arius  (Fruhstorfer, 1916) Sumatra
J. p. arcaseius (Fruhstorfer, 1916)  Nias
J. p. athanetus  (Fruhstorfer, 1916) Java
J. p. armatheus  (Fruhstorfer, 1916) Borneo
J. p. aegithus  (Fruhstorfer, 1916)  Waigiu
J. p. fasciatus  (Ribbe, 1926) Celebes

References

External links

Jamides at Markku Savela's Lepidoptera and Some Other Life Forms

Jamides
Butterflies described in 1877